Ezekiel Kalipeni (February 4, 1954 – April 11, 2020) was a Malawian geographer who specialized in population and environmental studies, medical geography, and Third World development issues. His research focused on sub-saharan Africa and the spread of pandemics in developing countries. He is most well known for his work in mapping and spatial analysis of the HIV/AIDS epidemic in Africa.  In 2014 he was recognized as the Kwado-Konadu-Agyemang Distinguished Scholar in African Geography by the American Association of Geographers.

Biography

Kalipeni was born in Mchinji, Malawi. Kalipeni received a Bachelor of Arts in Social Science in 1979 from the University of Malawi. He also taught there from 1986–1988.

He moved to the United States of America in the 1980s for graduate studies. He received a Masters and PhD in Population and Environmental Studies at the University of North Carolina at Chapel Hill. He worked at the National Science Foundation as the Director of the Geography and Spatial Sciences Program. He worked as a professor at the University of Malawi, Colgate University and University of Illinois, where he eventually retired. He also served as the editor of the African Geographical Review.

Kalipeni was the co-founder of the Kalipeni Foundation which he started with his wife, Fattima Kalipeni. The Kalipeni Foundation, is a non-profit organization focused on education and water projects in Luchenza, Malawi.

Awards

 Kwado-Konadu-Agyemang Distinguished Scholar in African Geography Award 2014 - American Association of Geographers 
 Best Paper of the Year 2012 - Journal of Map & Geography Libraries, Routledge

Selected bibliography 

Krabacher, T.; Kalipeni, E. and Layachi, A. 2009. Global Issues: Africa. 12th edition. McGraw-Hill Contemporary Learning Series.

Kalipeni, E.; Craddock, S.; Oppong, J. and Ghosh, J. Eds. 2004. HIV/AIDS in Africa: Beyond Epidemiology. Oxford: Blackwell Publishers
Kalipeni, E. and Zeleza, P. T. Eds. 1999. Sacred Spaces and Public Quarrels: African Economic and Cultural Landscapes. Lawrenceville, NJ: Africa World Press
Kalipeni, E. and Philip Thiuri. 1997. Issues and Perspectives on Health Care in Contemporary Sub-Saharan Africa. Lewiston, New York: Edwin Mellen Press

Kalipeni, E. 1994. Population Growth and Environmental Degradation in Southern Africa. Boulder, Colorado: Lynne Rienner Publishers

References

Malawian expatriates in the United States
Malawian geographers
University of North Carolina at Chapel Hill alumni
University of Malawi alumni
1954 births
2020 deaths